General elections were held in the Kingdom of Denmark on 1 November 2022, except in the Faroe Islands, where they were held on 31 October as 1 November was a national day of mourning for victims at sea. Of the 179 members of the Folketing, 175 were elected in Denmark proper, two in the Faroes and two in Greenland. The elections were called on 5 October following an ultimatum to the government by the Social Liberal Party (which had been providing external support) due to the outcome of a report on the 2020 Danish mink cull by the Mink Commission, which was critical of the government. Voter turnout was 84% in Denmark, 48% in Greenland, and 71% in the Faroes with a combined turnout of 84% for the Realm as a whole.

Initially looking like no bloc would gain a majority, left-leaning parties retained their majority due to results in the Faroe Islands and Greenland, but the majority was reduced to a single seat. The governing Social Democrats achieved their best result in 20 years, with 28% of the vote, while the Social Liberals experienced one of their worst ever results. Leading opposition party Venstre also suffered major losses in the elections, losing more than 40% of its seats. Two of the new parties standing in the elections, the Moderates and the Denmark Democrats, won 16 and 14 seats respectively, making them the third- and fifth-largest parties.

Following the elections, Frederiksen was appointed informateur; despite the left block winning a majority of seats, as she had said in her campaign, she opted to try and form a centrist government with Venstre and other parties from the blue bloc. After negotiations, a coalition government composed of the Social Democrats, Venstre and the Moderates was formed, the first time since 1977 where both main parties were part of a coalition government.

Background

The 2019 Danish general election on 5 June ended with a 91 seats win for the Social Democrats and Mette Frederiksen and their supporting parties. 22 days later, a minority government was formed by the Social Democrats. The government was supported by the other parties in the red bloc (the Danish Social Liberal Party, the Green Left, and the Red–Green Alliance). Frederiksen, the leader of the Social Democrats, became Prime Minister of Denmark.

On 2 July 2022 Sofie Carsten Nielsen, leader of the Social Liberals, one of supporting parties of the government, encouraged Frederiksen to set an election date before 4 October after the report of the Mink Commission was published, criticising the government's handling of the Cluster 5 outbreak in November 2020. Later the same day, Nielsen announced that she was ready to put forward a motion of no confidence if the prime minister refused to call early elections.

On 31 August a TV debate was announced between Frederiksen, Jakob Ellemann-Jensen, and Søren Pape Poulsen. On 5 October, Frederiksen announced that general elections were to be held on 1 November, the first to be held on a Tuesday since the 2007 Danish general election.

Electoral system

The 179 members of the Folketing are elected in Denmark (175), the Faroe Islands (2) and Greenland (2). The 175 seats in Denmark include 135 seats elected in ten multi-member constituencies of Denmark by proportional representation, using the d'Hondt method (kredsmandater), and 40 leveling seats, allocated to parties in order to address any imbalance in the distribution of the constituency seats (tillægsmandater). The main threshold for levelling seats is 2%.

According to the Constitution of Denmark, the election had to be held no later than 4 June 2023, as the last election was held on 5 June 2019. The incumbent prime minister is able to call the election at any date, provided that date is no later than four years from the previous election, and this is often cited as a tactical advantage to the sitting government, as it can call an early election when opinion polls are favourable. Lars Løkke Rasmussen, the previous prime minister from 2015 to 2019, announced on 7 May 2019 that elections would be held on 5 June; the latest date for that election was 17 June.

In order for a new party to be eligible to run in the election it must obtain declarations of support (vælgererklæringer) from a number of electors at least equal to 1/175th of the total valid votes cast at the previous elections. For the 2022 election, this figure was equal to 20,182 declarations of support. Four new parties (Moderates, Denmark Democrats, Independent Greens and Vegan Party managed to raise this amount thus becoming eligible for the election although the Vegan Party choose not to use its eligibility but insted merge with the Alternatives.

Voter eligibility 
One has the right to vote if one is 18 years old on election day, is a Danish citizen, lives within the Realm (Denmark proper, Greenland and the Faroe Islands) and are not disempowered (umyndiggjort). Disempowerment is for instance mental disabilities. All eligible voters are also eligible to run for election. After the election, all newly elected members of the Folketing must sign a declaration stating that they intend to comply with the Constitution, while the new Folketing must approve the election and the eligibility of the individual members. This is done in the Committee for Electoral Trials (Udvalget til Valgs Prøvelse). After the 2022 election all elected members of the Folketing were approved.

Issues 
In her speech announcing the election, Frederiksen declared the election to be a security election (Danish: tryghedsvalg), citing issues such as the 2022 Russian invasion of Ukraine, economic anxiety, and issues in the health system. In the same speech, Frederiksen also declared her intentions to work towards a centrist government with parties from both blocs rather than continue the incumbent one-party minority government.

Two of the parties supporting the Frederiksen Cabinet, the Red–Green Alliance and the Green Left, both came out in opposition to a centrist government, citing concerns of undue conservative influence. The blue bloc, including Liberal Alliance, the Conservative People's Party, Venstre, the Denmark Democrats, Nye Borgelige, and the Danish People's Party, also denied the possibility of a government with the Social Democrats. The Danish Social Liberal Party and especially the Moderates, who have been campaigning for a centrist government since their inception, supported Frederiksen's declaration.

Political parties 
The table below lists parties represented in the Folketing.

Denmark

Faroe Islands

Greenland

Opinion polls

Results

Maps

Aftermath and government formation 

The election was simultaneously the best result for the Social Democrats in more than 20 years and the worst result for Venstre in more than 30 years. Mette Frederiksen, the leader of the red bloc and the incumbent prime minister, thanked voters for giving the red bloc a majority; despite winning a slim majority of one seat, she decided to follow her campaign promise and resign in order to seek a new centrist government with parties from both sides of the political spectrum. Following the results, she was congratulated by the prime ministers of Norway and Spain, Jonas Gahr Støre and Pedro Sánchez, both members of her same European political group, the Party of European Socialists.

Lars Løkke Rasmussen, the leader of the Moderates who had long positioned himself as kingmaker, did not end up with the decisive seats because of the left-leaning majority. Instead, it was the Danish Social Liberal Party, traditionally a member of the red bloc, that stated a desire of wanting to go beyond bloc politics like the Moderates, despite achieving one of their worst ever results, meaning that along with the Moderates, they could determine the next government. Sofie Carsten Nielsen resigned as leader of the Social Liberals following its poor performance in the election. A total of 64 new politicians were elected to the Folketing for the first time at the 2022 election, the third-most in Danish history, only being trumped by the 1973 and 2011 general elections. The new members are mainly from the Denmark Democrats, Liberal Alliance, and Moderates.

On 23 November, the Red–Green Alliance and The Alternative announced they had left the government negotiations, bringing the number of negotiating parties to 8: the Social Democrats, Venstre, the Moderates, the Green Left, Liberal Alliance, the Conservatives, the Social Liberals and the Danish People's Party. The Denmark Democrats and New Right had earlier left the negotiations. On 3 December, the Conservatives exited the negotiations, reducing the number of negotiating parties to seven. The Social Liberals left the negotiations on 13 December. The same day, Mette Frederiksen went to the queen to present her new government, which includes the Moderates and Venstre; the first time the Social Democrats and Venstre formed a government together since 1978. Leader of Venstre, Jakob Elleman-Jensen, became deputy prime minister and minister of defence while leader of the Moderates Lars Løkke Rasmussen was made foreign minister. Nine social democrats lost their ministerial positions. Two ministers, both from the Moderates, are not members of the Folketing.

See also
List of members of the Folketing, 2022–

Notes

References

External links
Statistics Denmark's results page
Election polling and trends Politiken.dk
Greenland Folketing Election Results Qinersineq

Elections in Denmark
Elections in the Faroe Islands
Elections in Greenland
Denmark
Denmark